Augustana Vikings football may refer to:
 Augustana (Illinois) Vikings football, the college football team of Augustana College in Rock Island, Illinois
 Augustana (South Dakota) Vikings football, the college football team of Augustana College in Sioux Falls, South Dakota